In ring theory, a branch of abstract algebra, a quotient ring, also known as factor ring, difference ring or residue class ring, is a construction quite similar to the quotient group in group theory and to the quotient space in linear algebra. It is a specific example of a quotient, as viewed from the general setting of universal algebra. (Only the fraction slash "/" is used in quotient ring notation, not a horizontal fraction bar.)

Quotient rings are distinct from the so-called "quotient field", or field of fractions, of an integral domain as well as from the more general "rings of quotients" obtained by localization.

Formal quotient ring construction
Using the ideal properties, it is not difficult to check that  is a congruence relation.

 .

 ;
 .
(Here one has to check that these definitions are well-defined. Compare coset and quotient group.)

Examples
This fits with the rule of thumb that the larger the ideal I, the smaller the quotient ring . If I is a proper ideal of R, i.e., then  is not the zero ring.
Consider the ring of integers Z and the ideal of even numbers, denoted by 2Z. Then the quotient ring  has only two elements, the coset  consisting of the even numbers and the coset  consisting of the odd numbers; applying the definition, where 2Z is the ideal of even numbers. It is naturally isomorphic to the finite field with two elements, F2. Intuitively: if you think of all the even numbers as 0, then every integer is either 0 (if it is even) or 1 (if it is odd and therefore differs from an even number by 1). Modular arithmetic is essentially arithmetic in the quotient ring  (which has n elements).
Now consider the ring of polynomials in the variable X with real coefficients, R[X], and the ideal  consisting of all multiples of the polynomial . The quotient ring  is naturally isomorphic to the field of complex numbers C, with the class [X] playing the role of the imaginary unit i. The reason is that we "forced" , i.e. , which is the defining property of i.
Generalizing the previous example, quotient rings are often used to construct field extensions. Suppose K is some field and f is an irreducible polynomial in K[X]. Then  is a field whose minimal polynomial over K is f, which contains K as well as an element .
One important instance of the previous example is the construction of the finite fields. Consider for instance the field  with three elements. The polynomial  is irreducible over F3 (since it has no root), and we can construct the quotient ring . This is a field with  elements, denoted by F9. The other finite fields can be constructed in a similar fashion.
The coordinate rings of algebraic varieties are important examples of quotient rings in algebraic geometry. As a simple case, consider the real variety  as a subset of the real plane R2. The ring of real-valued polynomial functions defined on V can be identified with the quotient ring , and this is the coordinate ring of V. The variety V is now investigated by studying its coordinate ring.
Suppose M is a C∞-manifold, and p is a point of M. Consider the ring  of all C∞-functions defined on M and let I be the ideal in R consisting of those functions f which are identically zero in some neighborhood U of p (where U may depend on f). Then the quotient ring  is the ring of germs of C∞-functions on M at p.
Consider the ring F of finite elements of a hyperreal field *R. It consists of all hyperreal numbers differing from a standard real by an infinitesimal amount, or equivalently: of all hyperreal numbers x for which a standard integer n with  exists. The set I of all infinitesimal numbers in *R, together with 0, is an ideal in F, and the quotient ring  is isomorphic to the real numbers R. The isomorphism is induced by associating to every element x of F the standard part of x, i.e. the unique real number that differs from x by an infinitesimal.  In fact, one obtains the same result, namely R, if one starts with the ring F of finite hyperrationals (i.e. ratio of a pair of hyperintegers), see construction of the real numbers.

Variations of complex planes
But note that  is called the dual number plane in geometric algebra. It consists only of linear binomials as "remainders" after reducing an element of R[X] by X.  This variation of a complex plane arises as a subalgebra whenever the algebra contains a real line and a nilpotent.

This plane of split-complex numbers normalizes the direct sum  by providing a basis  for 2-space where the identity of the algebra is at unit distance from the zero. With this basis a unit hyperbola may be compared to the unit circle of the ordinary complex plane.

Quaternions and variations
Suppose X and Y are two, non-commuting, indeterminates and form the free algebra .  Then Hamilton’s quaternions of 1843 can be cast as 

The anti-commutative property  implies that XY has as its square

 (XY)(XY) = X(YX)Y = −X(XY)Y = −(XX)(YY) = −(−1)(+1) = +1.

Substituting minus for plus in both the quadratic binomials also results in split-quaternions.

The three types of biquaternions can also be written as quotients by use of the free algebra with three indeterminates R and constructing appropriate ideals.

Properties

The natural quotient map p has I as its kernel; since the kernel of every ring homomorphism is a two-sided ideal, we can state that two-sided ideals are precisely the kernels of ring homomorphisms.

The map g here is given by the well-defined rule  for all a in R. Indeed, this universal property can be used to define quotient rings and their natural quotient maps.

As a consequence of the above, one obtains the fundamental statement: every ring homomorphism  induces a ring isomorphism between the quotient ring  and the image im(f). (See also: fundamental theorem on homomorphisms.)

The following facts prove useful in commutative algebra and algebraic geometry: for  commutative,  is a field if and only if I is a maximal ideal, while  is an integral domain if and only if I is a prime ideal. A number of similar statements relate properties of the ideal I to properties of the quotient ring .

The Chinese remainder theorem states that, if the ideal I is the intersection (or equivalently, the product) of pairwise coprime ideals I1, ..., Ik, then the quotient ring  is isomorphic to the product of the quotient rings , .

For algebras over a ring
An associative algebra A over a commutative ring R is a ring itself. If I is an ideal in A (closed under R-multiplication), then  A / I inherits the structure of an algebra over R and is the quotient algebra.

See also
 Associated graded ring
 Residue field
 Goldie's theorem
 Quotient module

Notes

Further references
 F. Kasch (1978) Moduln und Ringe, translated by DAR Wallace (1982) Modules and Rings, Academic Press, page 33.
 Neal H. McCoy (1948) Rings and Ideals, §13 Residue class rings, page 61, Carus Mathematical Monographs #8, Mathematical Association of America.
 
 B.L. van der Waerden (1970) Algebra, translated by Fred Blum and John R Schulenberger, Frederick Ungar Publishing, New York. See Chapter 3.5, "Ideals. Residue Class Rings", pages 47 to 51.

External links
 
  Ideals and factor rings from John Beachy's Abstract Algebra Online

Ring
Ring theory